Leopold Johann Otto Wilhelm of Limburg Stirum (December 27, 1681 – February 11, 1726), was count of Limburg Styrum from the branch Limburg-Styrum-Iller-Aichheim. 

He was the first son of Maximilian Wilhelm of Limburg Stirum. In 1712, he married countess Barbara Draskovich de Trakostjan (June 27,1687 - died before 1734). The couple had two children:
 Maximilian Anton (born in 1713, probably died in 1726), 
 Amalia Wilhelmine (born in 1714, died before 1755).

He died before his father and the sovereignty of Simontornya went over to his younger brother Karl Joseph Alois.

Sources 
 De takken Gemen en Styrum van het geslacht van Limburg Stirum; Dr. A.J. Bonke; Stichting van Limburg Stirum; The Hague, 2007
 Iconografie van het Geslacht van Limburg Stirum; C.J. Graaf van Limburg Stirum; Walburg Instituut, Amsterdam, 1994
 A. Giraud, M. Huberty, F. et B. Magdelaine, "L'Allemagne Dynastique, Tome VII"

1681 births
1737 deaths
Leopold of Limburg Stirum